École Canadienne de Tunis (ECT) is a Canadian international school in Tunis, Tunisia. It has primary  and secondary levels.

The school opened in 2014.

The School is accredited to offer International Baccalaureate Programs (Primary PYP and Secondary MYP).

References

External links
  École Canadienne de Tunis
 
 

Schools in Tunis
Canadian international schools in Tunisia
Educational institutions established in 2014
2014 establishments in Tunisia
International Baccalaureate schools in Tunisia